Camizunzo is a small town to the east of the capital of Angola, Luanda, in Bengo Province.

Transport 

It is served by a station on the northern line of the national railway system.

See also 

 Railway stations in Angola

References 

Populated places in Bengo Province